Li Yannian (died 90 BC) was a Chinese musician during the Han Dynasty. He became a court musician during Emperor Wu's reign, but was eventually executed for treason.

His wrote the song Jiaren Qu (literally: The Beauty Song), describing a lady with exceptional beauty. Upon hearing this song, the Emperor did not believe there could be such a woman on earth, but his sister Princess Pingyang mentioned Li has a younger sister who could match the description, so Emperor Wu took Li's sister Li Furen as a concubine. Li Yannian himself allegedly was homosexual. When Emperor re-established the Imperial Music Bureau, Li Yannian was appointed a musician in the court. Li Yannian's brother Li Guangli also became a general in the Han armies.

Jiarenqu 
Jiarenqu (佳人曲, The Beauty Song) Book of the Later Han 67:34

 From the north comes a ravishing maiden,
 Whose beauty stands alone.
 One look at her, cities fall,
 On the second glance, empires collapse.
 Care not whether cities fall or empires collapse,
 Such beauty never comes around twice.

Death, execution, and treason 
After the death of his sister, Yannian's family began to lose Wu's favour. In 90 BC, much of the Li family was executed on multiple charges, including treason. According to one source, Li was executed in 90 BC during a struggle between the Li family and Empress Wei's family.

Notes

References
Rexroth, Kenneth (1970). Love and the Turning Year: One Hundred More Poems from the Chinese. New York: New Directions.
D. Twitchett & M. Loewe, The Cambridge History of China, 176

82 BC deaths
Executed Han dynasty people
1st-century BC executions
People executed by the Han dynasty
People executed for treason against China
Year of birth unknown
Han dynasty musicians
1st-century BC Chinese musicians